Khalid Jawed (born 9 March 1960) is an Indian novelist. Some of his works include Aakhri Dawat, Nematkhana and Maut ki Kitab, critically acclaimed for his unique style and narrative. Currently he is serving as Professor at Jamia Millia Islamia, New Delhi.

Jawed is also considered an expert on popular literature. He is equally popular in India and Pakistan.

Career

Critic Shafe Qidwai said "Khalid Jawed does not bury the plot behind the heavy pall of magic realism technique and his style is imbued with a new artistic coherence and he weaves a series of memories and wistful experiences into a viable pattern. It is hoped that the Maut ki Kitab will be noticed in literary circles."

The English translation of Jawed's novel Nemat Khana, The Paradise of Food', won the JCB Prize for Literature in 2022.

Bibliography
 Aakhiri Dawat|2007|Penguin Books India
 Tafreeh Ki Ek Dopehr|2008|Scheherzade, karaachi
 Kahani, Maut Aur Aakhiri Bidesi Zaban|2008|Educational Publishing House, Delhi
 Gabriel Garcia Marquez: Fan Aur Shakhsiyat|2009|Karnataka Urdu Academy, Bangalore
 Gabriel Garcia Marquez: Fan Aur Shakhsiyat|2010|Scheherzade, karaachi
 Maut Ki Kitaab|2011|Arshia Publications, Delhi
 Milan Kundera|2011|Arshia Publications, Delhi
 Nemat Khana|2014|Arshia Publications, Delhi

Translation in other languages 

 Maut Ki Kitab (Hindi)|2015|Dakhal Parkashan, Delhi
 The Paradise of Food (English)|2022|Juggernaut Publication| Delhi
 Ek Khanjar Paani Mein (Hindi) Setu Prakashan, 2022

Books on Khalid Jawed
Khalid Jawed: Shakhsiyat Aur Fan|2017|EDUCATIONAL PUBLISHING HOUSE, DEHLI
ASIN: B072XKCCW9

Awards
 Katha Award by Katha in 1997 
 UP Urdu Academy Award, Lucknow in 2014
 Delhi Urdu Academy Award for Creative Prose in 2017
 UP Urdu Academy Fiction Award 2020
 JCB Prize for literature 2022

References

Urdu-language writers from India
1960 births
Indian Muslims
People from Delhi
Urdu-language writers
Linguists of Urdu
Urdu critics
Living people
Academic staff of Jamia Millia Islamia